Augustine Steward (1491 – 1571), of Norwich, Norfolk, was an English politician.

Family
Augustine Steward was born and baptised in the parish of St. George’s Tombland, Norwich, the son of Jeffrey Steward (d.1504), an Alderman of Norwich and his wife Cecily, daughter of Augustine Boys, an armiger. This family can be traced back to the Stewards (Stewarts) of Scotland. Augustine married twice: (1) before 1548, Alice, daughter of Henry Repps, Esq., of Heveningham, by who he had three daughters. He married (2) Elizabeth, daughter of William Rede, Esq., of Beccles Manor, Suffolk (he died 1552), by whom he had six daughters and two sons, all of whom appear to have married well.

Career
Steward was a mercer and an armiger. He was admitted a Freeman of the City of Norwich on 12 March, 1516 and after serving for some years on the common council was elected an alderman in 1526, a position he was to retain until his death. He became the government’s leading supporter in Norwich, and his "good services" to the King earned him the praise of the Duke of Norfolk and of Sir Roger Townshend who commended him to Richard Cromwell. Steward’s standing with these magnates made him a valuable agent in the city’s efforts to benefit from the Reformation. He was Mayor of Norwich in 1534-35, 1546-47 and 1556-57. It was during his first mayoralty that negotiations were begun between the corporation and the cathedral authorities for a revision of Wolsey’s settlement of a longstanding dispute between them. Steward continued to pursue the matter, approaching Cromwell in May 1537 for his favour and later asking the minister to reverse Wolsey’s judgment placing the cathedral outside the city’s jurisdiction. Early in 1539 he was one of the attorneys appointed to argue the case before the King, and on 6 April Letters Patent were granted in the city’s favour. In the meantime he had also become the moving spirit in the attempt to anticipate the dissolution of the house of the Black Friars by acquiring it for the city. In 1538 he and his kinsman Edward Rede, after consultation with the Duke, asked Cromwell for his assistance to this end, and when the house was suppressed it was granted to the city on 1 June 1540, Steward himself paying the £81 required. During Kett's rebellion Steward was made acting Mayor after the insurgents had taken the Mayor prisoner. As one of the richest citizens he had much at stake and it must have been with relief that on the Marquess of Northampton’s arrival he presented the city’s sword and entertained the Marquess to dinner. But Northampton quickly withdrew, and when the rebels entered Norwich they forced their way into his house, ‘took him, plucked his gown beside his back, called him a traitor and threatened to kill him’, and then ransacked the house. On the approach of the Earl of Warwick the rebels sent Steward and Robert Rugge to negotiate on their behalf, but on being taken to Warwick the two revealed to him how his troops could retake the city. Despite his harrowing experience and a rebuke from Warwick for pusillanimity, Steward retained his standing in Norwich and was regularly in office for a further 15 years. He attended his last meeting of the Norwich assembly early in 1571, but he was replaced as one of the aldermen in April of that year.

Steward was a Member of Parliament (MP) for Norwich in 1539 and 1547.
Little has come to light about the commercial activity which yielded Steward his considerable wealth, but there is a reference to a venture of about 1530 in which, with his father-in-law Reginald Lytilprowe and others, he had a factor at Danzig to freight a ship to a value of 800 marks for a voyage to Great Yarmouth. Part of his profits went into Norfolk land: in 1530 he bought the manor of Welborne, and in 1548 the manor of Barton Buryhall, which 12 years later he settled on his son-in-law Robert Wood.

House

Steward lived in a house on Tombland, opposite Norwich Cathedral.

Death
Augustine Steward died in 1571 and was buried with his two wives within St. Peter's Church, Hungate, Norwich. His Will was proved in November.

Children

Augustine Steward had one son and two daughters by Alice Repps, his first wife, the widow of John Everard of Newton, Edward Steward, Faythe Steward and Elizabeth Steward.

Children of Augustine Steward and Elizabeth Rede, his second wife:

 William Steward of Goldthorpe in Swardeston, Norfolk m. 1) Elizabeth, daughter of Christopher Jenny of Cressingham, Norfolk, knight; 2) Grissell, daughter of Thomas Edon of Sudbury
 Children of William Steward and Elizabeth Jenny, first marriage:
 Augustine Steward
 Elizabeth, m. Richard Aldrich of Mangreene and had Thomas, Augustine Aldrich, Mercer of London, Richard, Christian, Anne and Mary
 Children of William Steward and Grissell Edon, second marriage:
 Thomas Steward of Swardeston in Norfolk who m. Mary, daughter of Henry, Lord Grey of Groby, Leicester, and had Henry, Mary, Anne and Elizabeth
 Henry, ob. s.p.
 Edward, who m. Anne, daughter of Gilbert Havers of Norfolk, and had William, Thomas, Edward, Francis, Charles, Gilbert, George who died s.p., and Augustin
 Anne, wife of John Buxston of Dickleborough
 Mary
 Thomas Steward
 Elizabeth Steward, who m. Thomas Sotherton  (by 1525 – 1583) of Norwich, gentleman, son of Nicholas Sotherton (d.1540) in Suffolk, and had four sons and four daughters.
 Cycelle Steward, who m. John Pickerell and had John Pickerell and Susan
 Anne Steward, who m. Sir Robert Wood, Mayor of Norwich, gentleman, and had Edmond Wood, Robert Wood and Elizabeth
 Mary Steward, who m. John Sotherton of Norwich, gentleman, the son of Nicholas Sotherton (d.1540), grocer, alderman and Mayor of Norwich, and had Mary Sotherton, John Sotherton, Thomas Sotherton and Anne Sotherton. Her sister Elizabeth was married to his brother Thomas, a double marriage between the families.
 Barbara Steward, who m. Christopher Layer of Norwich, gentleman, and had Augustine Layer, Elizabeth Layer, and Christopher Layer, who married Elizabeth, daughter of William Rugge (d.1616) of Felmingham in Norfolk, of the same Rugge family as the Bishop, and had William, Francis, Christopher who ob. s.p., Anne and Elizabeth
 Katherine Steward

References

1491 births
1571 deaths
Politicians from Norwich
Mayors of Norwich
English MPs 1539–1540
English MPs 1547–1552